Rugby union has a long history in Australia, with the first club being formed in 1863 at Sydney University. Today it holds tier one status with World Rugby and has over 82,000 players nationwide.

Early history and nineteenth century

Pre-codification football

There is some evidence of indigenous Australian forms of football being played in Australia, before the European arrival. Some of these involved kick and catch games. Early Europeans may well have played their own forms of traditional football as well, which involved kicking and handling.  With the arrival of Europeans, a form of football was played very early on with matches being played in by 1829 in Sydney, Melbourne by 1840, Brisbane by 1849, and Tasmania by 1851. Most of these early games took part at local festivals, with no clear set of rules being used, and no codified version of any game being played. Regional versions of football were played in places like South Australia using house rules predating Victorian codification of the game. The versions played locally in this period borrowed elements from the various codes that are present today including Australian rules, soccer and rugby with the rules played being decided prior to the start of the match.

The first reports of a sport like rugby being played in Australia date back to the 1820s when visiting ship crews would play army teams at Barrack Square.

As early as 1841, there is documented evidence of "foot-ball" being played in metropolitan and country Victoria as well as mention of early matches in Adelaide (1843) and southern Van Diemen's Land (Tasmania). The exact rules being played in these matches are unknown.

In 1858 English public school football games began to be played in Melbourne and surrounding districts. The earliest known such match was played on 15 June 1858 between Scotch College and Melbourne Grammar School on the St Kilda foreshore. Some of these games would evolve into Australian rules football.

Rugby football and Australian rules football

Australian rules football was first played in Australia in 1858. The founder of the game was Tom Wills. At the age of 14, Wills was sent to England to attend Rugby School, where he became captain of Rugby's cricket team.

The origins of Australian rules football are murky, with various theories being put forward, including an indigenous provenance, and an influence from Gaelic football. However, the influence of cricket is indisputable, as is the fact that Wills attended Rugby School. Geoffrey Blainey, Leonie Sandercock, Ian Turner and Sean Fagan have all written in support for the theory that the primary influence on the game was rugby football and other games emanating from English public schools.

Writing to Wills in 1871, Thompson recalled that "the Rugby, Eton, Harrow, and Winchester rules at that time (I think in 1859) came under our consideration, ... we all but unanimously agreed that regulations which suited schoolboys ... would not be patiently tolerated by grown men." The hardness of the playing fields around Melbourne also influenced their thinking. Even Wills, who favoured many rules of Rugby School football, saw the need for compromise. He wrote to his brother Horace: "Rugby was not a game for us, we wanted a winter pastime but men could be harmed if thrown on the ground so we thought differently."

Early rugby football

In 1863, the first formal rugby football club was formed at Sydney University. In 1869, Newington College was the first Australian school to play rugby in a match against the University of Sydney. From this beginning, the first metropolitan competition in Australia developed, formally beginning in 1874. This was organised by the Southern Rugby Union, which was administered by the rugby union at Twickenham, in England. Administration was given over to the Southern Rugby Union in 1881.

Rugby began outside of Sydney first in Queensland in 1876, with the first inter-colonial match being played in Sydney in 1882. During these years the rugby that was played, was administered by the Queensland Football Association, which was the organisation administering principally the Melbourne Rules football code. Primarily due to the poor treatment rugby received by the QFA, a new organisation to oversee rugby was founded at a meeting held on 2 November 1883 at the Exchange Hotel in Brisbane. This organisation was formally constituted a decade later in 1893, as the Queensland Rugby Union.

The first rugby union club to be established in Australia was Sydney University's in 1863. A decade after the first club was formed, a body called the Southern Rugby Union was formed as a result of a meeting at the Oxford Hotel in Sydney, a Sydney competition was established, which was administered from the England Rugby headquarters at Twickenham. The first competition commenced the following year in 1865 with 6 teams.

The 'Waratah' Rugby Club invited Australian rules football club, the Carlton Football Club to play two matches, one under rugby rules and one under Australian rules. On Saturday 23 June, 3,000 spectators watched Waratah beat Carlton at rugby at the Albert Cricket Ground in Redfern. In the return leg, Carlton defeated Waratah under Australian rules. A week later over 100 footballers formed the New South Wales Football Association (NSWFA) to play the Australian game. With its origins, image and administration anchored in England, supporters of rugby saw the code as a symbol and reminder of their Englishness.

The first inter-colonial game occurred in 1882, when players from the four Queensland clubs (who played both rugby and Australian rules football) travelled to NSW. NSW won by 28 points to 4 at the Sydney Cricket Ground in front of 4,000 spectators.

On 2 November, in 1883, the Northern Rugby Union was formed as the rugby body in Queensland after a meeting at the Exchange Hotel. As a result of the formation of the new body, several prominent GPS schools took up rugby as opposed to Melbourne Rules. That same year, the Southern Rugby Union undertook its inaugural tour of New Zealand, the following year, a New Zealand party travelled to Australia and the first club competition was held in Queensland. In 1888 the Melbourne Rugby Union was formed in Victoria. In 1892, the rugby bodies in Australia dropped Southern and Northern from their titles, adopting New South Wales and Queensland respectively. That year also saw the first British and Irish Lions tour take place, and although unsanctioned by official bodies in Europe, the 21-man squad travelled to both Australia and New Zealand.

In 1893, Frank Ivory was the first Indigenous Australian to play representative rugby union (for Queensland)

In 1899, the national team of Australia played their first match. The Hospital's Cup became an annual competition in Queensland.

Twentieth century

Arrival of rugby league

By the time England's new "Northern Union game" arrived in Australia it was fundamentally different from rugby union, with lineouts, rucks and two players from each team having already been removed, and the play-the-ball introduced.

In 1907, the schism that more than a decade earlier, had torn the Northern Rugby Football Union from the Rugby Football Union, arrived on Australia's doorstep. Rugby union's amateur high ideals, irked the working class rugby players who sought compensation for time away from work. A meeting took place at Bateman's Crystal Hotel in Sydney on 8 August 1907, where a resolution was made to form the New South Wales Rugby Football League. They played their first season in 1908.

Such was the impact of the arrival of rugby league, that in 1908, when the touring Wallabies team returned from England, eleven of the players joined rugby league teams. By 1910 rugby league had overtaken rugby union in popularity.

Recovery

In 1903, Australia played its first test against the All Blacks, in front of a crowd of 30,000 at the Sydney Cricket Ground. In 1907, Australia again played the All Blacks, at the same venue as the 1903 match, with crowd numbers reaching 50,000. This figure would not be surpassed again by rugby union at the ground after the start of rugby league in 1908 (the SFS commenced as the Sydney rectangular venue for rugby league and union in 1988).

By the time of the 1910 British Lions rugby league tour, rugby league was well entrenched as the major winter sport in all of Queensland, New South Wales and the Australian Capital Territory, surpassing rugby union. This was a position from which rugby union would never recover in Australia.

In 1928 the QRU reformed, and the GPS and major clubs returned to rugby union. In 1931, the governor of New Zealand donated a sporting trophy called the Bledisloe Cup, named appropriately after Charles Bathurst, 1st Viscount Bledisloe, for competition between Australia and New Zealand. The first game was held that year at Eden Park, though the official start of the competition is disputed between that game and the 1932 New Zealand tour to Australia.

During the 1930s, the playing of sport on Sunday was banned in most of the country outside South Australia. During the 1930s, rugby league, which had gone professional, began to overtake rugby union in popularity in Queensland, with the league being the dominant spectator code by 1937.

The late 1940s saw the construction of a national governing body, as opposed to the NSWRU being the main organisation. In 1949, the Australian Rugby Union joined the world governing body, then known as the International Rugby Football Board (IRFB). Since 2017, the national governing body has been known as Rugby Australia.

Impact of World War I

Heavy enlistments took their toll on the playing population of Rugby Union in Australia during World War I. The Queensland Rugby Union dissolved, and was only able to reorganise again in 1928. Such was the drop in playing numbers that the only players available during the 1920s for representing Australia were the Waratah players.

An event that was to greatly shape rugby union's future in Australia was the onset of World War I in 1914. While rugby league, which had been introduced to Australia in 1908, continued to play in the form of NSWRL competitions, rugby union competitions were suspended due to an overwhelmingly high percentage of rugby union players enlisting to serve in the Australian Imperial Force.

The enlistment of rugby union players was so quick and extensive, that by 1915, a Sydney newspaper reported: "According to figures prepared by Mr W. W. Hill, secretary of the New South Wales Rugby Union, 197 out of 220 regular first grade players are on active service, or 90 percent."

Weakened by the loss of its players to the war effort, the Queensland Rugby Union was dissolved in 1919. In the aftermath of the war, a large number of national representatives would defect to rugby league, giving rugby league a strong position in the states of New South Wales and Queensland, which it continues to maintain to this day.

1980s and 1990s 
In 1987, the first ever Rugby World Cup was held in both Australia and New Zealand, as a result of both the respective rugby bodies putting forth the idea to the IRFB. Australia was defeated by France in the semifinal stage.

In 1995, rugby union became openly professional in Australia following an agreement between SANZAR countries and Rupert Murdoch regarding pay television rights for the game. Australia won two world cups in the 90s, the 1991 Rugby World Cup defeating England in the final, and the 1999 Rugby World Cup defeating France in the final.

With rugby union becoming an openly professional sport in 1995, after more than a century of being a professed amateur code, major changes were seen in both the club and international game. The Super 12 rugby competition was born that year. The tournament involved 12 provincial sides from three counties; New Zealand, South Africa and Australia. Australia entered three sides into the competition; ACT Brumbies, Queensland Reds and the New South Wales Waratahs. The year also saw the Tri Nations Series, between the three Super 12 countries.

In 1999, the Bledisloe Cup match between Australia and the New Zealand All Blacks was staged at the Homebush Olympic Stadium, now known as ANZ Stadium. The game attracted a then world record crowd of 107,042 for a rugby union match. In 2000 this was bettered when a crowd of 109,874 witnessed the 'Greatest ever Rugby Match' when a Jonah Lomu try sealed a 39–35 All Blacks win over the Wallabies. The All Blacks had led 24-nil after 11 minutes only to see Australia draw level at 24 all by half time.

The Wallabies were champions of the 1999 Rugby World Cup in Wales, claiming their second Webb Ellis Cup trophy. In doing this, Australia became the first multiple winners of the tournament.

The new millennium 
The year 2003 saw the staging of the Rugby World Cup in Australia. Prior to the tournament, three high-profile Kangaroo rugby league players switched codes; Wendell Sailor, Mat Rogers and Lote Tuqiri. The fifth Rugby World Cup was held in various Australian cities from October to November in 2003. Matches were played all across the country, in Sydney, Brisbane, Melbourne, Canberra, Adelaide, Perth, Townsville, Gosford, Wollongong and Launceston. The tournament was hailed as a huge success, an estimated 40,000 international spectators travelled to Australia for the event, some estimations said that a $100 million may have been injected into the Australian economy. The Australian Rugby Union said that revenues exceeded all expectations, the tournament surplus was estimated to be at $44.5 million. The hosting of the World Cup in Australia also saw an increase in Super 12 crowds and junior participation. In 2005, to celebrate a decade of professional rugby union in Australia, the Wallaby Team of the Decade was announced.

In 2007, the ARU launched a national competition, the Australian Rugby Championship, with eight teams—three from New South Wales, two from Queensland, and one each from the ACT, Victoria and Western Australia. The ARC was scrapped after only one season due to higher-than-expected losses of $4.7 million.

In late 2013, the ARU announced plans to launch a new national competition to be known as the National Rugby Championship. Originally scheduled to launch in September 2014, after the Super Rugby season and much of The Rugby Championship, the competition was expected to involve 10 teams. Player payments were expected to be considerably lower than in the former ARC, and the NRC has a broadcast contract with Fox Sports. The ARU officially unveiled the NRC in March 2014 for an August launch with nine teams; the geographic distribution was identical to that of the former ARC, with the exception of a fourth NSW team. Since then, the competition has lost one domestic team but added the Fijian Drua, a developmental side for that country's national team.

In 2017, the Australian Rugby Union was renamed Rugby Australia, coinciding with relocating to their new premises in Moore Park, Sydney.

Australian National Team
The first international tour took place in 1899, when the two unions of New South Wales and Queensland played a four match series against a visiting team from the British Isles. Australia won its first match, but lost all remaining matches. The second match was played in Brisbane. Australia played its first match with New Zealand in 1903, and its second in 1907.

Birth of the Wallaby
The first international tour was organised for 1908, when a squad of players travelled nine months United Kingdom, Ireland and North America. Invited to play in the rugby tournament that was a part of the 1908 London games, Australia won the gold medal, defeating the English team.

Bledisloe Cup
In 1931, Lord Bledisloe the Governor General of New Zealand, donated a rugby trophy to honor the sporting rivalry between New Zealand and Australia.

Founding of a national union
Before 1947, all administration of Australian international rugby events was performed by the New South Wales Rugby Union. State unions in 1947 determined that Australia should be served by a national union in these matters. In 1948, World Rugby, then known as the International Rugby Football Board, extended the invitation to Australia and not the New South Wales Rugby Union, to take a seat on its board. This precipitated into the formation of the Australian Rugby Football Union (ARFU). Eleven delegates from the unions in New South Wales, Queensland, South Australia, Western Australia, Tasmania and Victoria met on 25 November 1949 for ARFU's inaugural meeting.

Co-hosting the first Rugby World Cup

The idea of a world cup tournament for rugby had arisen several times. Possibly as early as the 1950s murmurings of a world cup tournament were made by Harold Tolhurst. In 1979 Australian Rugby Union's president Bill McLaughlin was requesting that Australia host a Rugby World Cup in conjunction with its Bicentennial celebrations in 1988. The IRFB had turned down all of these requests, forbidding any member unions from planning or attending any such events. Two separate objections have been noted, the first that the IRFB felt that the underlying amateur principle of rugby would be effected, the second that they did not want a rugby tournament being run by commercial interests.

These objections were laid aside in 1984, after receiving separate requests from New Zealand and Australia, to host a world cup, the IRFB decided to approve a feasibility study of a Rugby World Cup. Joining forces, New Zealand and Australia began their study on 1 December 1984. Presenting their findings to the IRFB at the Paris meeting in March 1985, the approval for a joint Rugby World Cup was hard-won. With an IRFB split evenly, it took a detractor John Kendall-Carpenter to change his vote to the affirmative, to allow the World Cup to take place.

The Rugby World Cup was held between 22 May to 20 June 1987.

See also

 Origins of Australian rules football
 History of rugby league
 Rugby league in Australia
 Super Rugby

References

Sources

External links

Australia
Rugby union in Australia
History of sport in Australia